Statistics of Primera División Uruguaya for the 1991 season.

Overview
It was contested by 14 teams, and Defensor Sporting won the championship.

League standings

References
Uruguay - List of final tables (RSSSF)

Uruguayan Primera División seasons
1991 in Uruguayan football
Uru